Magic Tree House is an American series of children's books written by the American author Mary Pope Osborne. Other illustrators have been used for foreign-language editions.

The series consists of two groups. The first group consists of books 1–28, in which Morgan Le Fay sends Jack and Annie Smith, two normal children who are siblings from the fictional small town of Frog Creek, Pennsylvania, on numerous adventures and missions with a magical tree house. The second group, referred to as the Magic Tree House: Merlin Missions, begins with book 29, Christmas in Camelot. In Merlin Missions, Jack and Annie are given quests by the ancient wizard Merlin the Magician. These books are longer than the previous 28, and some take place in fantasy realms like Camelot. Kathleen and Teddy are two apprentices who befriend Jack and Annie during their adventures, with one of these adventures being to free Kathleen from a spell. The two occasionally join Jack and Annie, and, when they don't, provide them support instead. During Super Edition #1, Teddy sends them on a mission instead of Morgan or Merlin. The companion Magic Tree House Fact Trackers are co-written by Mary Pope Osborne with her husband Will Osborne or her sister Natalie Pope Boyce.

In the beginning, Mary Pope Osborne wrote the books with Morgan sending the children on missions. Then she switched over to them being sent on missions by Merlin. About 10 years later, in 2014, she switched back to writing only the books with Morgan sending them on missions. These books were, again, much shorter.
In addition to the books listed below, Mary Pope Osborne appears to still be writing the series, having released "#37 Rhinos at Recess" in 2023.

Series background 
After graduating college, Osborne and a friend went traveling. Osborne spent time in Crete and traveled through Iraq, Iran, India, Afghanistan, Turkey, Lebanon, Syria, and Pakistan. The trip came to an end when Osborne experienced blood poisoning in Nepal requiring her to stay in a hospital for a couple of weeks where she read The Lord of the Rings. Remarking on her travels Osborne said, "That journey irrevocably changed me. The experience gathered serves as a reference point every day of my life. I encountered worlds of light and worlds of darkness — and planted seeds of the imagination that led directly to my being an author of children's books."

Osborne's travels and experiences have factored largely into her own writing, while her writing has allowed her to experience some of the thrills of traveling. As she said, "Without even leaving my home, I’ve traveled around the globe, learning about the religions of the world."

Osborne's writing career began "one day, out of the blue" when she wrote Run, Run As Fast As You Can in 1982. The book itself is semi-autobiographical in nature, according to Osborne: "The girl was a lot like me and many of the incidents in the story were similar to happenings in my childhood." The book served as the starting point for Osborne's writing career. Her early work received mixed reviews. Her work includes young adult novels, picture books, retellings of mythology and fairy tales, biographies, mysteries, a six-part series of the Odyssey, a book of American Tall Tales, and a book for young readers about the major world religions.

The idea for the Magic Tree House series came when Penguin Random House asked Osborne to start writing a series of children's books. From the beginning Osborne knew she wanted to include time travel. The idea for the treehouse being the time-travel inducing object only came to her when she and her husband saw one on a walk through the forest in Pennsylvania.

Osborne says that she can work on Magic Tree House up to 12 hours a day and seven days a week and has used space at shared office space, The Writer's Room. She has modeled her writing after Hemingway by trying to be simple and direct and is "noted for writing clear, lively, well-paced prose in both her stories and her informational books."

Main characters 
When Osborne started writing the series she wrote Jack as a main character and added Annie as a typical annoying younger sister. After writing her in, Osborne eventually decided to add Annie in as another main character. Osborne highlights Annie’s bravery as a characteristic to serve as a main difference between Annie and herself, as Osborne has noted that she often wished she were braver than she was.

Jack Smith 
Jack is the older brother who is known for his love of books and learning, an attribute Osborne says connects her to the character. Jack has a tendency to be cautious in his approach. According to the original illustrations by Sal Murdocca, Jack is pictured with brown hair, red glasses, and is taller than Annie.

Annie Smith 
Annie is the younger sister and is known for her bravery, impulsive decisions, and her care for the people and animals around her. According to the original illustrations by Sal Murdocca, Annie is pictured with medium-length blond hair, often in double braids, and bangs.

Repetition 
The repetition in the books is one quality that makes the series easier for younger readers to understand. Each book includes Jack and Annie traveling to some time or place via their magic treehouse to solve a mystery. The objective of their mission is often clear and usually involves collecting an object or meeting a specific person of historical importance.

Repetition also occurs in the actual writing of the books. The sentences, “The wind started to blow. The tree house started to spin. It spun faster and faster. Then everything was still. Absolutely still” occur in at least 32 of the ‘Magic Tree House’ books as of 2005.

Repetition is known to make learning to read easier, as kids get to practice seeing and hearing the same sentences until they are comfortable with them.

Legacy 
Mary Pope Osborne's books have been named to a number of the Best Books of the Year Lists, including, School Library Journal, Parents’ Magazine,  The Bulletin of the Center for Children's Books, and Bank Street College of Education. She has received honors from such organizations as the National Council of Teachers of English, The Children's Book Council, and the International Reading Association. She received the 1992 Diamond State Reading Association Award, 2005 Ludington Memorial Award from the Educational Paperback Association and the 2010 Heidelberger Leander Award. She has also received awards from the Carolina Alumni Association, the Virginia Library Association and in spring 2013 she was awarded an Honorary Doctorate of Letters from the University of North Carolina at Chapel Hill.

Osborne served two separate terms as president of the Authors Guild and also chaired its Children's Book Committee. She has since traveled extensively in the states and throughout the world, visiting schools and speaking on issues related to reading and books. In 2011, she attended the Tokyo International Film Festival for the premiere of the Magic Tree House anime film and visited schools in the tsunami-hit area of Japan. The film grossed 5.7 million dollars; Osborne donated all her proceeds into her educational works.

She was profiled on NBC's Rock Center with Brian Williams for her continued efforts to get books into the hands of underserved children on a Magic Tree House-themed tour bus. She spoke of the pressure she feels as an author that children look up to, "for a child to value someone who writes books is so extraordinary."

To celebrate the 20th anniversary of the Magic Tree House series in 2012, Osborne created a Magic Tree House Classroom Adventures Program. Osborne's mission with Classroom Adventures is to inspire children to read and to love reading while simultaneously helping kids to read at grade level by the end of 3rd grade. Free of charge, the program provides a set of online educational resources for teachers and allows for Title 1 schools to apply for free Magic Tree House books. Under Classroom Adventures, Osborne, in partnership with the First Book organization in Washington, D.C., has donated hundreds of thousands of Magic Tree House books to underserved schools.

Adaptations

Magic Tree House Children's Theatre 
The Magic Tree House brand has taken on other forms. A full-scale musical adaptation was created by Will Osborne and Randy Court; Magic Tree House: The Musical, premiered in September 2007. Osborne hoped that it would have the same kind of kid and adult appeal as The Lion King or Mary Poppins. Based on the Magic Tree House book Christmas in Camelot, the Musical has toured nationally and had a cast album.

A planetarium show; Magic Tree House: Space Mission, also created by Will Osborne, is produced and presented exclusively at the Morehead Planetarium in Chapel Hill, North Carolina.

In 2011, Will Osborne collaborated with New Orleans composer Allen Toussaint and Ain't Misbehavin''' co-creator Murray Horwitz to write A Night in New Orleans, a musical adaptation of Magic Tree House #42: A Good Night for Ghosts about the life of Louis Armstrong. The show features an ensemble cast and live jazz band. It premiered in 2012 at the New Jersey Performing Arts Center and was shown free to every Newark 4th grade student.Magic Tree House Kids Shows are theatrical adaptations of selected titles in the Magic Tree House series designed specifically for performance by kids. To date, children's shows have been created by husband and wife playwright and composer team Randy Courts and Jenny Laird in collaboration with Will Osborne based on the following Magic Tree House books: Dinosaurs Before Dark, The Knight at Dawn, Pirates Past Noon, A Ghost Tale for Christmas Time, A Night in New Orleans, and Stage Fright on a Summer Night, a new children's show based on the life of William Shakespeare, set to premiere at the Orlando Shakespeare Theatre in October 2017.

 Film adaptation 
The animated film , produced by Media Factory, premiered in Japan in October 2011 and was generally released there on January 7, 2012.

In 2016, Lionsgate acquired the film rights with a script by Will Osborne and Jenny Laird. The film will primarily contain plot elements from Book #29, Christmas in Camelot.

 List of Magic Tree House books 
According to its official website, Magic Tree House books are for beginning chapter book readers.

 Main series 

 Merlin Missions subseries Magic Tree House: Merlin Missions books 1-27 were written for more advanced readers. They are more challenging adventures for readers ages 7–10. The Magic Tree House: Merlin Missions were originally ordered sequentially, starting at Book #29 (Christmas in Camelot). With the 25th anniversary re-prints, the books have been separated into their own distinct series and re-numbered starting at Merlin Mission #1.

 Magic Tree House Super Edition book 
On January 6, 2015, the first and only Magic Tree House Super Edition book was released. It is 183 pages long. The super editions are longer than the original Magic Tree House books and the Magic Tree House: Merlin Missions.

 Nonfiction books 
The Magic Tree House Fact Trackers (formerly called Magic Tree House Research Guides) are non-fiction companions to the fiction books, written by Mary Pope Osborne, Will Osborne, and Natalie Pope Boyce. They were first released in 2000 by Scholastic and Random House. They provide more in-depth follow-up information on the topics in the series than already covered.  44 have been published. The first two Fact Trackers were published in August 2000 as companions for the first two stories, then 7 to 8 years old. In 2008 story #39, Dark Day in the Deep Sea and its fact tracker #17, Sea Monsters'' were the first story and fact tracker to be published simultaneously.

Other Magic Tree House books

References

External links
 
 Magic Tree House at Media Factory 
 Mary Pope Osborne blog
 

Book series introduced in 1992
Fantasy books by series
American children's books
Series of children's books
Novels about time travel
Novels set in Pennsylvania